The Other Live Collection is the second full-length live album by English singer-songwriter Alison Moyet, released on 20 April 2018 by Cooking Vinyl. The album features live cuts from her 2017 The Other Tour, her first world tour in 30 years.

Critical reception

Lucy Mapstone, in a review of the album for The Irish News, described it as a "delight" and a showcase for Moyet's "stunning vocals". The reviewer concluded: "In an album of highlights, Moyet proves that she is still at the top of her game in a career spanning more than three decades."

Track listing

Charts

References

External links
Alison Moyet's official website

2018 live albums
Alison Moyet albums
Cooking Vinyl live albums